Kolukh-e Pain (also Romanized as Kolūkh-e Pā’īn; also known as Kolūkh and Kūlūkh) is a village in Jowshaqan-e Qali Rural District, Qamsar District, Kashan County, Isfahan Province, Iran. At the 2006 census, its population was 37, in 14 families.

References 

Populated places in Kashan County